Aleksandr Sergeyevich Fyodorov (born 25 August 1970 in Zelenodolsk) is a former Russian football player.

References

1970 births
People from Zelenodolsk, Russia
Living people
Soviet footballers
Russian footballers
FC KAMAZ Naberezhnye Chelny players
Russian Premier League players
Association football defenders
FC Neftekhimik Nizhnekamsk players
Sportspeople from Tatarstan